Sympis rufibasis is a moth of the family Noctuidae first described by Achille Guenée in 1852. It is found from the Indo-Australian tropics of India, Sri Lanka, Borneo east to New Guinea, the Solomons and Queensland.

Description
Its wingspan is 48 to 50 mm. The male has an orange-red head and thorax. Abdomen reddish brown. Forewings with orange-red basal area, bounded by an oblique blue line. The outer area reddish brown with a large scarlet lunule beyond the cell and a white speck on the costa above it. An indistinct, irregularly dentate, sub-marginal line and a marginal specks series present. Hindwings fuscous with incomplete medial white band and waved marginal line. Ventral side almost entirely grey suffused. A crenulate postmedial line present. Female lack scarlet lunule on forewings.

Larva darkish, olive green brown with a distinct pale yellow stripe which runs along each side and extends from the head to the anal prolegs. The larvae feed on Dimocarpus, Litchi and Nephelium species.

References

Catocalinae
Moths of Asia